Kurt Mitchell (19 November 1951 – 17 May 2007) was a Canadian sports shooter. He competed in the men's 50 metre rifle three positions event at the 1976 Summer Olympics.

References

External links
 

1951 births
2007 deaths
Canadian male sport shooters
Olympic shooters of Canada
Shooters at the 1976 Summer Olympics
Sportspeople from Lethbridge
Pan American Games medalists in shooting
Pan American Games bronze medalists for Canada
Medalists at the 1979 Pan American Games
Shooters at the 1979 Pan American Games
20th-century Canadian people